Christopher James Picton (born 13 January 1983) is an Australian politician representing the South Australian House of Assembly seat of Kaurna for the South Australian Branch of the Australian Labor Party since the 2014 state election. He has served as the Minister for Health and Wellbeing in the Malinauskas ministry since March 2022, previously shadowing the role while in opposition.

Political career
Prior to being elected to parliament, Picton was chief-of-staff for his predecessor John Hill and later a staffer for Nicola Roxon, the federal Minister for Health and Attorney-General.

Picton was appointed as a member of the Cabinet of South Australia in September 2017 as Minister for Police, Minister for Correctional Services, Minister for Emergency Services, and Minister for Road Safety; and served in these roles until Labor lost the 2018 state election. After Labor won the 2022 state election, Picton was appointed as Minister for Health and Wellbeing in the Malinauskas ministry.

References

External links
Parliamentary Profile: SA Labor website
 

|-

|-

Members of the South Australian House of Assembly
1983 births
Living people
21st-century Australian politicians